Vallathol Award is a literary award given by the Vallathol Sahithya Samithi for contribution to Malayalam literature. The award was instituted in 1991 in memory of Vallathol Narayana Menon, one of the modern triumvirate poets (Adhunika kavithrayam) of Malayalam poetry. The prize includes a cash prize of  1,11,111 and a plaque.

Awardees

References

Indian literary awards
Awards established in 1991
Malayalam literary awards
1991 establishments in India